Marián Klago (born 6 July 1971) is a retired Slovak football midfielder.

References

1971 births
Living people
Slovak footballers
FK Dukla Banská Bystrica players
FC Spartak Trnava players
FK Hvězda Cheb players
FC Slovan Liberec players
SFC Opava players
FC Nitra players
Bohemians 1905 players
AS Trenčín players
FC Zbrojovka Brno players
MŠK Žilina players
Association football midfielders
Slovak expatriate footballers
Expatriate footballers in the Czech Republic
Slovak expatriate sportspeople in the Czech Republic
Czech First League players